Chris Miles may refer to:

 Chris Miles (musician) (born 1999), American rapper
 Chris Miles (Skins), fictional character in the British teen drama Skins, portrayed by Joe Dempsie
 Chris Miles (politician) (born 1947), Australian politician